Diassonema Mucungui (born 6 June 1996) is an Angolan judoka. She is a bronze medalist at the African Games and a three-time medalist at the African Judo Championships. She represented Angola at the 2020 Summer Olympics held in Tokyo, Japan.

Career 

In 2019, she won one of the bronze medals in the women's 57 kg event at the African Judo Championships held in Cape Town, South Africa. In 2020, she won the gold medal in this event at the African Judo Championships held in Antananarivo, Madagascar.

She competed in the women's 57 kg event at the 2021 Judo World Masters held in Doha, Qatar. She also competed in the women's 57 kg event at the 2020 Summer Olympics held in Tokyo, Japan.

Achievements

References

External links 
 

Living people
1996 births
Place of birth missing (living people)
Angolan female judoka
Competitors at the 2019 African Games
African Games medalists in judo
African Games bronze medalists for Angola
Judoka at the 2020 Summer Olympics
Olympic judoka of Angola